

Events
12 June — Qutb al-Din Aibak ascended to the throne of Delhi. He was first Muslim king of Delhi and was founder of Mamluk Dynasty (Delhi).

Births

Deaths
15 March —  Muhammad of Ghor, Sultan of Ghurid Empire from 1173 to 1206 AD.

1206 in Asia
13th century in India